Dallas Carl Bradshaw (November 23, 1895 – December 11, 1939), nicknamed "Windy", was an American second baseman who played one season in Major League Baseball (MLB) with the Philadelphia Athletics. He was 5'7" and weighed 145 lbs.

References

Major League Baseball second basemen
Philadelphia Athletics players
Baseball players from Illinois
1895 births
1939 deaths
Owensboro Distillers players
Asheville Tourists players
Springfield Green Sox players
New Haven Murlins players
People from Herrin, Illinois